María del Carmen Brusíloff Ugarte, known as Carmenchu, is a journalist, columnist, and writer from the Dominican Republic. She is editor-in-chief of the magazine Aldaba.

Brusíloff was born to Constantino Brusíloff, a Russian academician and combatant in World War I and the Spanish Civil War, and to María Ugarte, a Spanish journalist and writer.

Works 
Retazos de una vida (2015)

References 

Dominican Republic journalists
Dominican Republic women journalists
Dominican Republic people of Russian descent
Dominican Republic people of Spanish descent
Dominican Republic people of Basque descent
White Dominicans
Living people
Year of birth missing (living people)
Place of birth missing (living people)